Körner, also rendered Koerner, or Korner is a German surname which may refer to

People

 Alexis Korner (1928–1984), born Koerner, musician
 Alfred Körner (1926–2020), Austrian footballer
 August T. Koerner (1843–1912), American politician
 Brendan I. Koerner, contributing editor for Wired magazine
 Christian Gottfried Körner (1756–1831), German writer and lawyer
 David Korner (1914–1976), Romanian and French communist militant
 Diana Körner (born 1944), German actress
 E. F. K. Koerner (born 1939), German and Canadian professor of linguistics
 Edith Körner (1921–2000), British magistrate, wife Stephan, mother of Thomas William
 Friedrich Körner (1921–1998), German World War II flying ace
 Gabriel Köerner (born 1982), visual effects artist
 Gustav Koerner (1809–1896), German revolutionary, American politician
 Hal Koerner, American ultramarathon runner
 Henry Koerner, Austrian-American painter
 Hildegard Körner (born 1959), German athlete
 Jason L. Koerner (born 1972), American movie producer, actor, author and former Navy Seal 
 Joseph Koerner (born 1958), US art historian
 John Korner (born 1967), painter based in Copenhagen
 John Koerner (born 1938), American singer, guitarist and songwriter
 Jules Gilmer Korner Jr. (1888–1967), judge of the United States Board of Tax Appeals
 Julius Körner (1870–?), German rower who competed in the 1900 Summer Olympics
 Oskar Körner (1875–1923), killed as participant of Adolf Hitler's failed Beer Hall Putsch
 Paul Körner (1893–1957), German Nazi official
 Robert Körner (1925–1989), Austrian footballer
 Roy Koerner  (1932–2008)
 Rudolf Körner (1892–?), German gymnast in the 1912 Summer Olympics
 Stephan Körner (1913–2000), philosopher, husband of Edith, father of Thomas William
 "Spider" John Koerner, guitarist and vocalist for the blues trio Koerner, Ray & Glover
 Theodor Körner (author) (1791–1813), German poet and soldier
 Theodor Körner (Austrian president) (1873–1957), Austrian general and President of Austria
 Thomas William Körner (1946), British mathematician and author
 Thomas Körner (writer) (born 1942), German writer (:de:Thomas Körner (Schriftsteller))
 Thomas Körner (cartoonist) (born 1960), German cartoonist (:de:Thomas Körner (Cartoonist))
 Walter Koerner (1898–1995), Canadian businessman
 Wilhelm Heinrich Detlev Körner (1878–1938), painter
 Wilhelm Körner (1839–1925), German chemist

Places
 Körner, Germany, is a municipality in the Unstrut-Hainich district of Thuringia, Germany.

See also
Korn (disambiguation)